Kathy Jordan and Elizabeth Smylie successfully defended their title, by defeating Betsy Nagelsen and Barbara Potter 7–6, 2–6, 6–2 in the final.

Seeds

Draw

Finals

Top half

Bottom half

References

External links
 Official results archive (ITF)
 Official results archive (WTA)

Virginia Slims of Florida
1986 Virginia Slims World Championship Series